Accropode blocks are wave-dissipating concrete blocks designed to resist the action of waves on breakwaters and coastal structures.

History

The Accropode is a single-layer artificial armour unit developed by Sogreah in 1981. Accropode concrete armour units are applied in a single layer. 
  

The Ecopode armour unit with a rock-like appearance was developed by Sogreah to enhance the natural appearance of concrete armourings above low water level. A patent application was filed in 1996. The color and type of rock-like appearance can be specified to match the surrounding landscape.
 

In 1999, Sogreah modified the original Accropode shape by chipping away excess materials and adding friction features in the form of small pyramids. A patent application was filed for this modified shape. In 2004 further modifications to the 1999 shape were made, resulting in the Accropode II. The shape modifications are intended to increase interlocking.

Design

Hydraulic stability 
Specified stability coefficients at design stage:
 
 Hudson’s design KD values: 						
 15 on trunk sections (16 for Accropode II)
 11.5 on roundheads (12.3 for Accropode II)
 Van der Meer stability number:
 
NS = HS/(∆ Dn50)= 2.7 (2.8 for Accropode II)
  
where:
 
HS = significant wave height
 
∆ = relative mass density
 
Dn50 = nominal diameter
 
These coefficients are valid for armour slopes from 3H/2V to 4H/3V and for seabed slopes up to 3%.
 
The uneven surface of the Ecopode improves interlocking by friction, thereby increasing hydraulic stability.

Implementation

Fork-lifting is effective for handling the small to medium size units, whereas large units are handled by sling. Placement for breakwaters generally requires a crane or a barge-mounted crane.

The units can be stored one on top of the other, and placed in a random attitude to obtain the specified packing density. The proper packing method provides an adequate coverage on breakwater slopes.

The use of a remote-release hook is used for placing the unit, while underwater placements may be enhanced by GPS, adhering to a theoretical grid.

Gallery

See also
 Breakwater (structure)
 Erosion control
 Riprap
 Artificial reef
 Coastal erosion
 Ocean surface wave
 Seawall
 KOLOS
 Xbloc

References

External links
 Ciria-CUR (2007) - Rock Manual - The use of rock in hydraulic engineering.
 K. d'Angremond (2004) - Breakwaters and closure dams.
 N.W.H. Allsop (2002) - Breakwaters, coastal structures and coastlines.
 J.W. Van der Meer (1988) - Rock slopes and gravel beaches under wave attack.
 Delft Hydraulics Laboratory (1987) - Stability of rubble mound breakwaters - Stability formula for breakwaters armoured with Accropode (report H 546).
 U.S. Army Corps of Engineer Waterways Experiment Station (WES) - Shore Protection Manual (1984) - Hudson formula based on Hudson's extensive work in the fifties.

External links

 Concrete Layer Innovations
 POSIBLOC™ system for placement aid of concrete blocks
 MEDUS (Maritime Engineering Division University Salerno)
 Concrete Layer Assistance and Survey CLAS: Specialized Company for ACCROPODE™ ACCROPODE™II CORELOC™ ECOPODE™ and Xbloc® armouring breakwaters 

Coastal engineering
Wave-dissipating concrete blocks